G. Krishnaiah (8 February 1957 – 5 December 1994) was an Indian Administrative Service (IAS) officer of 1985 batch who was killed in Muzaffarpur, Bihar by the mob led by a few politicians. At the time of death in 1994, he was 37 years old and serving as the District Magistrate (DM) of Gopalganj district, the home district of the then CM Lalu Prasad Yadav.

Death
In 2007 Patna District Court convicted six politicians for his killing. The politicians convicted include Anand Mohan Singh and his wife Lovely Anand (both ex-MPs), Vijay Kumar Shukla known as "Munna Shukla" (MLA), Akhlaq Ahmed and Arun Kumar (both ex-MLAs), Harendra Kumar (senior JDU leader) and SS Thakur.

References

People murdered in Bihar
Bihari politicians
1994 deaths
Indian Administrative Service officers
Deaths by beating
1994 murders in India
1957 births